The Svartsengi Power Station (Svartsengi; "black meadow" in Icelandic) is a geothermal power plant, which is located in the Svartsengi geothermal field, about four km north of Grindavík, approximately 20 km SE of Keflavík International Airport and 45 km from Reykjavík. 
The electric power station was built in 1976 by the subsidiary of Alterra Power, HS Orka and it was the world´s first geothermal power plant for electric power generation and hot water production for district heating.

The power station, which consists of an area of 150 ha, was constructed in six sequent phases (finished in 2008), in each phase they built a new power plant, so the generation capacity increased to 150 MWth for the district heating and the nameplate capacity to 75 MW for electricity power.

Since the Svartsengi Power Station is the only heating system for the local district on the Reykjanes Peninsula, which pipes hot geothermal water to more than 21,000 households, it is considered one of the most important heating plants.

This Geothermal Power Plant not only produces hot water and energy, but has also produced spin-offs; one of these side products is one of Iceland's most popular bathing resorts, the Blue Lagoon, and another spin off is the first renewable methanol plant, Carbon Recycling International.

Geothermal Power Plant details 

In the beginning of 1976, the Svartsengi Geothermal Power Plant was completely liquid-dominated, but it changed into a liquid dominated with a steam cap geothermal system.

Today, it consists of 13 production boreholes connected to the six plants, eight of those wells are producing a mixture of steam and brine and the other five are shallow dry steam wells.

It also possesses one of the largest Supervisory control and data acquisition (SCADA) in Iceland with the P-CIM monitors and the 50 substations, which include hot water/ cold water/ electricity distribution systems and 11 turbines and generators.

Power Plant Units 

Nowadays, the combined capacity of the Svartsengi Power Plant is 75 MW in electrical energy and 150 MW in thermal energy.

Energy Plant 1, with its two back-pressure turbines, was constructed in 1977 – 1979. It consisted of four thermal energy circuits, which produced 40 L/s of heating water and 50 MW energy for its own power needs, but today it is mostly out of action and only two circuits are in use, so the produced capacity is 25 MW of thermal energy.

Energy Plant 2 was built in 1980 and it produces, with its three thermal energy exchange systems 225 L/s (3 x 75 L/s) of  hot water and 75 MW (3 x 25 MW) energy.
 
Energy Plant 3, with its 6 MW counter-pressure steam turbines, is especially used for producing electricity. Each second 40 kg of  steam passes through the turbines with 5 bar pressure.

Energy Plant 4, with its seven 1.2 MW Isopentan Ormat turbines, was built in 1989-1992 to produce energy with  hot excess steam and low pressure steam from the other energy plants.

Energy Plant 5 was built in 1999 to substitute the old energy plant 1 and to increase the energy and hot water, so the demand could be met. It produces with its 30 MW  turbines and 75 MW thermal energy exchange system, around 225 GWh per annum.

Energy Plant 6 is a condenser plant with unique high pressure steam turbines and a total capacity of 30 MW. It produces only electricity, which depends on the using of the district heating and the electrical use.

See also 

 Geothermal power in Iceland
 List of largest power stations in the world
 Renewable energy in Iceland
 List of power stations in Iceland

References

External links 
Official website
Technology explanation

Geothermal power stations in Iceland
Reykjanes
Buildings and structures in Keflavík
Reykjanes Volcanic Belt